Geandry Garzón Caballero (born November 3, 1983 in Santiago de Cuba) is a male freestyle wrestler from Cuba. He participated in Men's freestyle 66 kg at 2008 Summer Olympics. He lost the bronze medal fight with Otar Tushishvili.

He represented Cuba at the 2020 Summer Olympics  held in Tokyo, Japan. He competed in the men's 74 kg event.

References

External links
 
 
 

1983 births
Living people
Cuban male sport wrestlers
Olympic wrestlers of Cuba
Wrestlers at the 2008 Summer Olympics
Wrestlers at the 2020 Summer Olympics
Pan American Games medalists in wrestling
Pan American Games gold medalists for Cuba
Wrestlers at the 2007 Pan American Games
Wrestlers at the 2019 Pan American Games
Medalists at the 2019 Pan American Games
World Wrestling Championships medalists
Pan American Wrestling Championships medalists
Sportspeople from Santiago de Cuba
20th-century Cuban people
21st-century Cuban people